Garganji (also Romanized as Gārganjī) is a village in Gowharan Rural District, Gowharan District, Bashagard County, Hormozgan Province, Iran. At the 2006 census, its population was 102, in 20 families.

References 

Populated places in Bashagard County